Minneapolis, the largest city in the U.S. state of Minnesota, is home to 190 completed high-rises, 41 of which stand taller than . The tallest building in Minneapolis is the 57-story IDS Center, which rises  and was designed by architect Philip Johnson. The tower has been the tallest building in the state of Minnesota since its completion in 1973, and is the 66th-tallest building in the United States. The second-tallest skyscraper in the city and the state is Capella Tower, which rises  and was completed in 1992. Overall, seventeen of the twenty tallest buildings in Minnesota are located in Minneapolis. Additionally, most of the tallest buildings in Downtown Minneapolis are linked via the Minneapolis Skyway System, the largest pedestrian skywalk system in the world.

The history of skyscrapers in the city began with the construction of the Lumber Exchange Building, now also known as the Edison Building, in 1886; this structure, rising  and 12 floors, is often regarded as the first skyscraper in Minnesota and one of the first fire-proof buildings in the country. The Lumber Exchange Building also stands as the oldest structure outside of New York City with at least 12 floors. Minneapolis went through a small building boom in the early 1920s, and then experienced a much larger boom lasting from 1960 to the early 1990s. During this time, 24 of the city's 36 tallest buildings were constructed, including the IDS Center, Capella Tower and Wells Fargo Center. The city is the site of twelve skyscrapers at least  in height, including three which rank among the tallest in the United States. , the skyline of Minneapolis is ranked 11th in the United States, 2nd in the Midwest (after Chicago), and 82nd in the world with 32 buildings rising at least .

There are at least 12 high-rises or skyscrapers either under construction or approved to begin construction throughout the city. The tallest of these is the downtown condominium building Eleven, which, at 550 feet (168 m), will be the tallest residential building in the state of Minnesota when completed in 2022.



Tallest buildings
This includes spires and architectural details but does not include antenna masts. The "Year" column indicates the year in which a building was completed.

Tallest buildings by pinnacle height

This list ranks Minneapolis skyscrapers based on their pinnacle height, which includes radio masts and antennas. As architectural features and spires can be regarded as subjective, some skyscraper enthusiasts prefer this method of measurement. Standard architectural height measurement, which excludes antennas in building height, is included for comparative purposes.

Under construction
This lists high-rises and skyscrapers under construction or topped-out in Minneapolis that are expected to rise at least 200 feet (61 m).

Proposed and Approved
This lists buildings Under Design Review, Approved or Proposed in Minneapolis and are planned to rise at least .

Timeline of tallest buildings

This lists buildings that once held the title of tallest building in Minneapolis.

See also
 List of Registered Historic Places in Hennepin County, Minnesota
 List of tallest buildings in Minnesota

Notes
A. Demolished in 1958.
B. Demolished in 1940.
C. Demolished in 1962.

References
General
 
Specific

External links
 Diagram of Minneapolis skyscrapers on SkyscraperPage

Minneapolis
 
Buildings and structures in Minnesota
Tallest in Minneapolis